Heidelberg Road is a major arterial road through the north-eastern suburbs of Melbourne.  It was the first road in Victoria outside the township of Melbourne.  Heidelberg Road was the main route for people travelling to Heidelberg, from the mid to late 1800s.

History
Access was required to the Heidelberg area by wealthy settlers in the 1830s.
Heidelberg Road started as a track at Smith Street, Melbourne, crossing two creeks, Merri Creek and Darebin Creek.

The road's maintenance was undertaken by the Heidelberg Road Trust, formed in 1841, by the election of local landowners.  The Trust was the first local government body in Victoria.  Earlier, Heidelberg residents had contributed to the funding of the first bridge over Darebin Creek.  The road was completed in 1842, and is believed to have followed an Aboriginal traditional route.  The Trust was the first road trust established in the Colony of New South Wales.

In 1847 Victoria's first toll gate was established, near Merri Creek, to fund the road's maintenance.  This allowed the road to be surfaced with macadam, the first such road in Victoria, and the road itself became a tourist attraction.  This work was completed in 1848, and the road was known as the "Great Heidelberg Road".

The Heidelberg Road Trust was replaced by the Heidelberg Road Board, in 1861, which was then also responsible for other roads in the area.

The causeway across Merri Creek was replaced by a bridge in 1854, which was washed away ten years later.  Its replacement was completed by 1868.

Heidelberg Road was an important early development corridor leading out of Melbourne.  A mixture of well developed areas and sparsely developed areas along the road had occurred by 1914.  The sparsely developed areas were mostly filled in by 1931, and by 1945 light commercial shops and warehousing was in place with some smaller sites being consolidated.  The present day nature of development along the road, light industrial and commercial, had been established by 1956.

The elimination of the railway crossing at the Clifton Hill railway gates, where Heidelberg Road crossed the Hurstbridge and Whittlesea railway lines and then Hoddle Street, was replaced by an overpass, between February 1956 and May 1957.

Heidelberg Road was signed as Metropolitan Route 46 in 1965. It shared a concurrency with Metropolitan Route 2, from Chandler Highway in Alphington to The Boulevard in southern Ivanhoe, also signed in 1965; this was replaced by Tourist Route 2 in 1989.

The passing of the Road Management Act 2004 granted the responsibility of overall management and development of Victoria's major arterial roads to VicRoads: in 2004, VicRoads re-declared the road as Heidelberg Road (Arterial #5812), beginning at the intersection at Queens Parade and ending at Merri Creek through Clifton Hill, and as Main Heidelberg-Eltham Road (Arterial #5762) from Merri Creek in Clifton Hill and the intersection of Upper Heidelberg and Lower Heidelberg Roads in Ivanhoe (the declaration continues east along Lower Heidelberg Road to Banksia Street in Eaglemont). The road is still presently known (and signposted) as Heidelberg Road along its entire length.

Aboriginal impact
Heidelberg Road was an area used by local Aboriginal people for encampments.

In 1840, the Mounted Police executed a military ambush of 500 Aboriginal men who had gathered on the road, arresting many and imprisoning them.

Major intersections

Notes

References

Further reading
 
 
 For the early governance of the road: 
 
 
 

Roads in Victoria (Australia)
Streets in Melbourne
Transport in the City of Darebin
Transport in the City of Yarra
Transport in the City of Banyule